The 2012–13 Pittsburgh Panthers women's basketball team represented the University of Pittsburgh in the 2012–13 NCAA Division I women's basketball season. The Panthers were coached by Agnus Berenato in their final year as a member of the Big East Conference. The Panthers played their home games at the Petersen Events Center in Pittsburgh, Pennsylvania except for one game at Fitzgerald Field House.

Season
The Panthers went 0-16 in Big East Conference play for the second year in a row prompting the replacement of head coach Agnus Berenato with Suzie McConnell-Serio on April 12, 2013.

Roster

Six-foot, 11-inch center Marvadene "Bubbles" Anderson redshirted during the 2012-13 season.

Schedule
Pitt's 2012-13 women's basketball schedule.

|-
!colspan=9| Exhibition

|-
!colspan=9| Regular Season

|-
!colspan=9| PostseasonBig East Women's Basketball Championship

|-
|-

Note: All-Access is the CBS Sports Network's suite of subscription-based live video web streaming of the respective schools selected sports events.

References

External links
 Official Site

Pittsburgh Panthers women's basketball seasons
Pittsburgh